HMS Zephyr was a Z-class destroyer. She was launched on 13 July 1942 at Vickers-Armstrong on Tyneside and commissioned on 6 September 1944.  She was 'adopted' by the civil community of Doncaster, replacing the destroyer  (sunk in 1943), which had originally been adopted during Warship Week in 1942.

Design and construction
The Z-class were War Emergency Programme destroyers, intended for general duties, including use as anti-submarine escort, and were to be suitable for mass-production. They were based on the hull and machinery of the pre-war J-class destroyers, but with a lighter armament (effectively whatever armament was available) in order to speed production. The Z-class of eight ships formed the 10th Emergency Flotilla, one of five flotillas of War Emergency destroyers ordered under the 1941 War Construction Programme (the U, V, W, Z and Ca-classes (40 destroyers)).

Displacement was  standard and  full load.

The ship had a main gun armament of four 4.5-inch (120 mm) QF Mk. IV guns, capable of elevating to an angle of 55 degrees, giving a degree of anti-aircraft capability, with the Z-class being the first class of destroyers to use the new gun.  The close-in anti-aircraft armament was one Hazemayer stabilised twin mount for the Bofors 40 mm gun, and six Oerlikon 20 mm cannons (two twin and two single mounts, which was later modified by replacing the Oerlikon cannon with four single 2-pounder (40 mm) "pom-pom" autocannon. Two quadruple mount for 21-inch (533 mm) torpedoes was fitted, while the ship had an depth charge outfit of four depth charge mortars and two racks, with a total of 70 charges carried. She had a crew of 179 officers and other ranks.

Zephyr was ordered on 10 February 1942, and was laid down at Vickers-Armstrong's Walker, Tyneside shipyard on 13 July 1942. She was launched on 15 July 1943 and completed on 6 September 1944.

Second World War
Following commissioning, Zephyr worked up at Scapa Flow and then joined the 2nd Destroyer Flotilla of the Home Fleet in October 1944. On 14 November, Zephyr was part of the escort for the carrier  during a sweep off Trondheim, during which Pursuers aircraft sank the German patrol boat V6413 was sunk. On 27 November Zephyr was part of the escort for the carrier  during Operation Provident as the carrier's aircraft attacked a convoy off Mosjøen. Over 2300 men, including large numbers of Soviet prisoners of war, were killed by the sinking of Rigel. On 14 December Zephyr was part of the escort for the carriers  and Trumpeter and the cruiser  when the force was spotted by a German reconnaissance aircraft. In response, the Germans launched a 30-aircraft strong torpedo-bomber strike, but it failed to find the British force.

During anti-submarine operations on 31 December 1944 Zephyr was damaged in an explosion off of the Pentland Firth, due to either a torpedo from the submarine , or a mine. The aft boiler room was flooded and the ship temporarily lost steam and electrical power. After all torpedoes and upper-deck depth charges were jettisoned to reduce topweight, Zephyr made it to port. One of her crew was killed. After inspection and temporary repair at Scapa Flow, permanent repairs were made by Caledon Shipbuilding at their Dundee yard from 8 January to 12 April 1945. On 18 April she joined the escort of Arctic convoy JW 66. The convoy was not attacked during its journey to Russia, but there was a strong force of U-boats off the entrance to the Kola Inlet, where sonar conditions made the submarines difficult to detect. To counter this, the escort laid down a blind barrage of depth charges when it arrived at the Kola Inlet on 25 April to force the convoy past the U-boat patrol line, this preventing the U-boats from attacking the convoy. The return convoy, Convoy RA 66, set out from the Kola Inlet on 29 April, with Zephyr forming part of its escort until 7 May. The merchant ships of the convoy were unharmed. As the war reached its end Zephyr stopped at Copenhagen with other Royal Navy ships on 9 May to accept the surrender of a number of German warships, including the cruiser Prinz Eugen. In June and July she undertook occupation duties at Wilhelmshaven and Kiel. Zephyr was refitted at Portsmouth from 23 July to 8 September, having her fire control director tower fitted, and took part in Operation Deadlight, the scuttling of surrendered German U-boats in November–December 1945.

Postwar
Between August 1946 and May 1947 Zephyr was part of the 4th Destroyer Flotilla as part of the Home Fleet. Between July 1947 and February 1948 the destroyer was with the Portsmouth Flotilla as Gunnery ship. In February 1948 she transferred to the 3rd Escort Flotilla, based at Portland. In February 1949 she was leader of the 2nd Training Flotilla. On 28 February 1952, Zephyr collided with the submarine rescue ship  and on 13 June that year collided with the submarine  and was holed below the waterline. It was planned to convert Zephyr to a Type 15 frigate, but this was cancelled due to the poor physical condition of the ship, with extensive corrosion. In June 1953 she attended the Coronation Review at Spithead.

She was paid-off to reserve status in the Portsmouth Reserve Fleet in December 1953. In November 1956, Zephyr was offered for sale to Peru, but the offer was not accepted.

Disposal
Zephyr was transferred to BISCO for disposal on 27 June 1958, and arrived at the shipbreaking company Clayton and Davie's yard at Dunston on 2 July 1958 for scrapping.

References

Publications

External links
 HMS Zephyrs career

 

W and Z-class destroyers
Ships built on the River Tyne
1943 ships
World War II destroyers of the United Kingdom
Cold War destroyers of the United Kingdom